A by-election for the seat of Northumberland in the New South Wales Legislative Assembly was held on 26 May 1884 because of the resignation of Atkinson Tighe due to ill health.

Dates

Candidates
 William Christie was a surveyor from Sydney who stood unsuccessfully for Tenterfield in 1880, Northumberland and Gloucester in 1882.

 Thomas Hungerford was a free trader and a former member for Northumberland who had decided to stand for The Upper Hunter at the 1882 election but was defeated.

 Richard Luscombe was a co-founder of the Protection and Political Reform League with the other sitting member for Northumberland, Ninian Melville.

Result

Atkinson Tighe resigned.

See also
Electoral results for the district of Northumberland
List of New South Wales state by-elections

References

1884 elections in Australia
New South Wales state by-elections
1880s in New South Wales